The Bond Buyer is a century-old daily national trade newspaper based in New York City and focused on covering the municipal bond industry. It is published Monday through Friday, except holidays. The newspaper is printed on tabloid-sized paper and typically features three to four stories on the front page.

The paper focuses on different regions of the United States each day and maintains news bureaus in Washington, D.C., Chicago, Florida, Atlanta, Dallas and San Francisco.

The news organization maintains a website, which provides breaking-news updates throughout trading days as well as archives and statistics. The website, like the paper, is viewable to paid subscribers.

Notes
 The Milford Wind Corridor Phase I project was named The Bond Buyer's Far West "Deal of the Year" in 2010.
 Lawrence J. Haas won an award from The Bond Buyer for his coverage of the 1985–1986 tax-reform debate in Congress.

References

Further reading
^ The Bond Buyer Official site. Retrieved July 5, 2021.

^ "Financial Times Blog, ft.com/alphaville, cited The Bond Buyer, 1st paragraph: Adventures at the long end of the muni yield curve". Retrieved May 11, 2011.

^ "WSJ followsThe Bond Buyer's GOP Reps File Bill to Sanction Municipalities for Pension Fund Lapses". Two days after The Bond Buyer broke the story. Retrieved December 5, 2010.

^ "Aolnews.com cites The Bond Buyer's factual reporting on California's debt rating, 6th paragraph: California's Massive Debt Is for Sale, So Who's Buying?". Retrieved November 12, 2010.

^ "Business Insider Blogger Gus Rubin cites The Bond Buyer, 1st paragraph: Pennsylvania Is About To Take Over Pittsburgh's Pension Fund And Rip It To Shreds" Retrieved October 20, 2010.

^ "USATODAY cites The Bond Buyer, 2nd to last paragraph: Hundreds of tax issues on the ballots this year". Retrieved October 19, 2010.

^ "MSN.com referenced Bond Buyer Editor, Amy Resnick's Twitter account, for an article entitled: Bonds based on pot sales? regarding facts reported at The Bond Buyer's annual California Public Finance Conference". Retrieved October 8, 2010.

^ "SeekingAlpha.com cited The Bond Buyer, 5th paragraph: Unintended Consequences of Basel III on Tax-Free Money Market Funds". Retrieved October 4, 2010.

^ "Bloomberg credits The Bond Buyer for reporting facts first, end of story: Moody's Asks Municipalities to Indemnify Firm on Ratings". Retrieved August 26, 2010.

^ "Bloomberg credits The Bond Buyer for reporting facts first, 3rd paragraph: Build America Bond Subsidy Cost May Increase by $6 Billion, CBO Estimates". Retrieved August 20, 2010.

^ "Bloomberg credits The Bond Buyer for reporting facts first, 6th paragraph: New Jersey Seeks Adviser on Plan to Tap $1 Billion of Unspent Bond Funds". Retrieved August 10, 2010.

Business newspapers published in the United States
Daily newspapers published in New York City